Live at Vision Festival is a live album by the Stone Quartet: bassist Joëlle Léandre, trumpeter Roy Campbell, pianist Marilyn Crispell, and violist Mat Maneri. It was recorded in June 2010 at the Vision Festival held at the Abrons Arts Center in New York City, and was released in 2011 by Ayler Records.

Reception

In a review for All About Jazz, Eyal Hareuveni called the album "an exemplary document of free-improvisation," and wrote: "It's free-flowing, full of musical ideas, unique dynamics with a cohesive narrative... The Stone Quartet offers cerebral music that demands the utmost attention, but rewards with an exceptional performance."

A reviewer for The Free Jazz Collective described the album as "a captivating listening experience" and stated: "the overall sound evolves like waves in a stream, with phrases colliding and contrasting, yet all moving in the same direction... there is the incredible sense of pace, quite slow, yet determined, creating eery soundscapes, full of longing and inherent tension between the four instruments.

Track listing
Composed by Joëlle Léandre, Roy Campbell, Marilyn Crispell, and Mat Maneri.

 "Vision One" – 32:20
 "Vision Two" – 9:20

Personnel 
 Joëlle Léandre – double bass
 Roy Campbell – trumpet, flute
 Marilyn Crispell – piano
 Mat Maneri – viola

References

2011 live albums
Joëlle Léandre albums
Roy Campbell Jr. live albums
Marilyn Crispell live albums
Mat Maneri albums
Ayler Records live albums